Metixene (brand names Methixart, CholinFall, Tremonil, Trest), also known as methixene, is an anticholinergic used as an antiparkinsonian agent.

See also
3-Quinuclidinyl thiochromane-4-carboxylate
Dothiepin

References

Antiparkinsonian agents
Muscarinic antagonists
Thioxanthenes
Piperidines